Sylhet-4 is a constituency represented in the Jatiya Sangsad (National Parliament) of Bangladesh since 2008 by Imran Ahmad of the Awami League.

Boundaries 
The constituency encompasses Companiganj, Gowainghat, and Jaintiapur upazilas.

History 
The constituency was created for the first general elections in newly independent Bangladesh, held in 1973.

Ahead of the 2008 general election, the Election Commission redrew constituency boundaries to reflect population changes revealed by the 2001 Bangladesh census. The 2008 redistricting altered the boundaries of the constituency.

Members of Parliament

Elections

Elections in the 2010s

Elections in the 2000s

Elections in the 1990s 
Saifur Rahman stood for three seats in the June 1996 general election, and won two of them: Sylhet-4 and Moulvibazar-3. He chose to represent Moulvibazar-3 and quit Sylhet-4, triggering a by-election. His main opponent from the general election, Imran Ahmad, was elected in a September 1996 by-election.

References

External links
 

Parliamentary constituencies in Bangladesh
Sylhet District
Jaintiapur Upazila